Ronald Vink and Robin Ammerlaan defeated Stéphane Houdet and Nicolas Peifer in the final, 6–2, 4–6, 6–1 to win the men's doubles wheelchair tennis title at the 2012 Australian Open.

Shingo Kunieda and Maikel Scheffers were the reigning champions, but Kunieda did not participate. Scheffers partnered Satoshi Saida, but was defeated in the semifinals by Houdet and Peifer.

The 2012 Australian Open – Wheelchair men's doubles is a tennis tournament featuring 8 paraplegic men tennis players, which is part of the NEC Tour. The tournament takes place at Melbourne Park in Melbourne, Australia, from 25 January to 28 January 2012, it is the 10th edition of the Australian Open men's wheelchair event and the first Grand Slam event of 2012. The tournament is played on Plexicushion Prestige AO hard courts, which is rated a medium-fast pace by the ITF. The competition is organised by the International Tennis Federation and Tennis Australia.

Seeds
  Stéphane Houdet /  Nicolas Peifer (final)
  Ronald Vink /  Robin Ammerlaan (champions)

Draw

Finals

References

External links
 Main Draw

Wheelchair Men's Doubles
2012 Men's Doubles